Piershill railway station was a railway station in Edinburgh, Scotland, on a loop off the main line. It was opened on 22 March 1868.

Piershill station closed in 1964, when passenger rail services were withdrawn from the Musselburgh branch rail service as part of the British Railways rationalisation programme known as the Beeching Axe, although the line itself was retained for rail freight use. The route was used for infrequent movement of waste from Powderhall to the East Coast Main Line until 2016.

Piershill was near the temporary  station which was opened during the Commonwealth Games in Edinburgh in 1986;  Meadowbank station closed shortly after the games finished.

References

Sources

External Links

Disused railway stations in Edinburgh
Beeching closures in Scotland
Former North British Railway stations
Railway stations in Great Britain opened in 1868
Railway stations in Great Britain closed in 1917
Railway stations in Great Britain opened in 1919
Railway stations in Great Britain closed in 1964